Diana Golden may refer to:

 Diana Golden (skier)
 Diana Golden (actress)